The 1871 New York state election was held on November 7, 1871, to elect the Secretary of State, the State Comptroller, the Attorney General, the State Treasurer, the State Engineer, a Canal Commissioner and an Inspector of State Prisons, as well as all members of the New York State Assembly and the New York State Senate.

History
The Democratic state convention met on October 4 at Rochester, New York, and re-nominated six of the seven incumbents. Only Diedrich Willers, Jr., was nominated for Secretary of State in place of Homer A. Nelson.

Results
In the wake of the Tweed and Canal Ring scandals, the whole Republican ticket was elected.

The incumbents Nichols, Champlain, Bristol, Richmond, Chapman and McNeil were defeated.

97 Republicans, 25 Democrats and 6 Reform Democrats were elected for the session of 1872 to the New York State Assembly.

Notes

Sources
Result: THE STATE ELECTION.; Official Announcement of the Result of the Vote for State Officers in NYT on December 9, 1871 [without vote for State Engineer]
Result in The Tribune Almanac 1872

See also
New York state elections

1871
1871 New York (state) elections